Zaragoza, also known in English as Saragossa, is the capital city of the Zaragoza Province and of the autonomous community of Aragon, Spain. It lies by the Ebro river and its tributaries, the Huerva and the Gállego, roughly in the center of both Aragon and the Ebro basin.

The population of the metropolitan area was estimated in 2006 at 783,763 inhabitants. The municipality is home to more than 50 percent of the Aragonese population.

Zaragoza hosted Expo 2008 in the summer of 2008, a world's fair on water and sustainable development. It was also a candidate for the European Capital of Culture in 2012.

The city is famous for its folklore, local cuisine, and landmarks such as the Basílica del Pilar, La Seo Cathedral and the Aljafería Palace. Together with La Seo and the Aljafería, several other buildings form part of the Mudéjar Architecture of Aragon which is a UNESCO World Heritage Site. The Fiestas del Pilar are among the most celebrated festivals in Spain.

Etymology
The Romans and Greeks called the ancient city  (in Greek ), from which derive the Arabic name   (used during the Al-Andalus period), the medieval , and the modern Zaragoza.

History

Roman Caesaraugusta

The Sedetani, a tribe of ancient Iberians, populated a village called  ( in Roman sources). Later on, Augustus founded a city called Caesaraugusta at the same location to settle army veterans from the Cantabrian wars. The foundation date of Caesaraugusta has not been set with exact precision, though it is known to lie between 25 BC and 11 BC.

Middle Ages 
The city did not suffer any decline during the last centuries of the Roman empire and was captured peacefully by the Goths in the fifth century AD.

In the eighth century, following the Umayyad conquest of the Iberian Peninsula, Zaragoza became the capital of the Upper March of al-Andalus.

In 1018, amid the collapse of the Caliphate of Córdoba, Zaragoza became an independent Taifa of Zaragoza, initially controlled by the Tujibid family, then ruled by the Banu Hud from 1039. The taifa greatly prospered in a cultural and political sense in the late 11th century, and being later governed by Ahmad al-Muqtadir, Yusuf al-Mu'taman ibn Hud and Al-Musta'in II. It fell to the Almoravids in 1110.

On 18 December 1118, Alfonso I of Aragon conquered the city from the Almoravids, and made it the capital of the Kingdom of Aragon. The aforementioned monarch created a jurisdictional dominion in the city, which was gifted to Gaston of Béarn. The city remained a lordship up until the early 13th century.

Early Modern history
An outbreak of bubonic plague decimated the city in 1564. It reportedly killed about 10,000 people out of an estimated population of 25–30,000.

In the context of the 1701–1714 War of Spanish Succession, the city rose in arms in favour of the Archduke Charles, who was proclaimed "King of Aragon" in the city on 29 June 1706, following the uprising of other parts of the Kingdom of Aragon in December 1705. Charles entered the city in July 1706, directing the attack on those places of Aragon that had sided with the Bourbon faction such as Borja or the Cinco Villas. Following the April 1707 battle at Almansa, the tide turned with the Austracist forces fleeing in disarray, and the Bourbon forces commanded by the Duke of Orléans entering the city on 26 May 1707. As he seized control of the kingdom, he began to enact the series of institutional reforms known as the Nueva Planta, abolishing the Aragonese institutions in favour of the Castilian ones. The war turned around again in 1710 after the Battle of Almenar, and, following another Bourbon defeat near Zaragoza on 20 August 1710, Archduke Charles returned to the city on the next day. This was for only a brief period, though, as following the entry of Philip V in Madrid and the ensuing Battle of Villaviciosa in December 1710, the Habsburg armies fled from Zaragoza in haste in December 1710 and Philip V proceeded to consolidate his rule over the kingdom of Aragon, resuming administrative reforms after a period of institutional void.

An important food riot caused by the high price of bread and other necessity goods took place in the city in April 1766, the so-called , named after the repressive agents, volunteer farmers and craftsmen who wielded swords and bucklers. The repression left about 300 wounded, 200 detainees and 8 deaths and it was followed by 17 public executions, and an indeterminate number of killings at the dungeons of the Aljafería.

Late Modern history

Zaragoza suffered two famous sieges during the Peninsular War against the Napoleonic army: a first from June to August 1808; and a second from December 1808 to February 1809, surrendering only after some 50,000 defenders had died.

Railway transport arrived to Zaragoza on 16 September 1861 via the inauguration of the Barcelona–Zaragoza line with the arrival of a train from the former city to the Estación del Norte. The opening of the Madrid–Zaragoza line took place a year and a half later, on 16 May 1863.

The July 1936 coup d'état (with Gral. The military uprising in Africa on 17 July was followed in the early morning of 19 July by the military command, easily attaining their objectives in Zaragoza, despite the latter's status as stronghold of mobilised labour (most of them CNT anarcho-syndicalists but also UGT trade unionists), as the civil governor critically refused to give weapons to the people in time. Many refugees, including members of the provincial committees of parties and unions, would flee to Caspe, the capital of the territory of Aragon, which was still controlled by the Republic.

The rearguard violence committed by the putschists, with already at least 12 murders on 19 July, would only go in crescendo along the beginning of the conflict. Thus one of the two big cities under Rebel control since the early stages of the Spanish Civil War along Seville, Zaragoza profited from an increasing industrial production vis-à-vis the war economy, playing a key role for the Francoist faction as ammunition manufacturer.

The General Military Academy, a higher training center of the Spanish Army, was re-established on 27 September 1940 by José Enrique Varela, the Francoist Minister of the Army.

The 1953 Accords ensued with the installment of a joint US–Spain air base in Zaragoza.

The increase in population ran parallel to the rural flight and depopulation in the rest of Aragon.

In 1979, the Hotel Corona de Aragón fire killed at least 80. The armed Basque nationalist and separatist organization ETA has been blamed, but officially the fire is still regarded as accidental. ETA carried out the Zaragoza barracks bombing in 1987 which killed eleven people, including a number of children, leading to 250,000 people taking part in demonstrations in the city.

Since 1982, the city has been home to a large factory built by General Motors for the production of Opel cars, some of which are exported to the United Kingdom and sold under the Vauxhall brand. The city took advantage of the entry of Spain into the European Communities (later European Union).

Geography

Location 

Zaragoza lies in the north-east of the Iberian Peninsula, in the rather arid depression formed by the valley of the Ebro. The Ebro cuts across the city in a west north-west by east south-east direction, entering the municipality at 205 metres above sea level and exiting the municipality at a level of 180 metres above sea level.

The city enjoys a beneficial location at the geographical centre of the rough hexagon formed by the Spanish cities of Bilbao, Madrid, Valencia and Barcelona and the French cities of Bordeaux and Toulouse.

While the river banks are largely flat, the territory flanking them can display a rugged terrain, featuring  and escarpments. The surrounding elevations rise up to heights of about 600–750 metres above sea level. The locations near the meanders of the Ebro feature some sinkholes formed upon the subsidence of the gypsum-rich soil, that can form ponds fed from irrigation water. There is also an instance of seasonal endorheic lagoon, in the moors located in the southern part of the municipality.

The Roman core of Caesaraugusta was founded on the right bank of the Ebro, with the north-east corner limiting the confluence of the Ebro with the Huerva river, a modest right-bank tributary of the Ebro. The Huerva runs through the city buried for much of its lower course. Zaragoza is also located near the confluence of the Ebro with the Gállego, a more voluminous left-bank tributary born in the Pyrenees.

Climate
Zaragoza has a semi-arid climate (Köppen: BSk), as it lies in a wide basin entirely surrounded by mountains which block off moist air from the Atlantic and Mediterranean. The average annual precipitation is a scanty  with abundant sunny days, and the rainiest seasons are spring (April–May) and autumn (September–November), with a relative drought in summer (July–August) and winter (December–March).

Night frost is common and there is sporadic snowfall.

Administrative subdivisions 
Zaragoza is administratively divided into 15 urban districts and 14 rural neighborhoods:

Demographics

The population, in thousands, can be seen here:

Religion 
According to a survey carried out by the Centro de Investigaciones Sociológicas (CIS) in 2019 with a sample size of 300, 51.0% of the surveyed people described themselves as non-practising Catholic, 24.0% as practising Catholic, 6.7% as indifferent/non-believer, 5.0% as agnostic, 4.3% as atheist and 2.3% as "other religions", while a 6.7% did not answer.

Immigration 
In 2017 there were 64,003 foreign citizens in Zaragoza, which represent 9.6% of the total population. From 2010 to 2017 immigration dropped from 87,735 to 64,003 people, a 27% drop. Romanians represent 29.8% of foreigners living in Zaragoza, or 2.9% of the total city population, followed by Moroccans (9.1%) and Chinese (7%).

Economy

An Opel factory was opened in 1982 in Figueruelas, a small village nearby. The automotive industry is a main pillar of the regional economy along with Balay, which manufactures household appliances; CAF, which builds railway rolling stock for both the national and international markets; SAICA and Torraspapel in the stationery sector; and various other local companies, such as Pikolin, Lacasa, and Imaginarium SA. 

Furthermore, since December 2003, it has been a city through which the AVE high-speed rail travels. Currently, Zaragoza Airport is a major cargo hub in the Iberian Peninsula, behind only Madrid, Barcelona, and Lisbon.

Zaragoza is home to a Spanish Air and Space Force base, which was shared with the U.S. Air Force until 1994. In English, the base was known as Zaragoza Air Base. The Spanish Air Force maintained a McDonnell Douglas F/A-18 Hornet wing at the base. No American flying wings (with the exception of a few KC-135s) were permanently based there, but it served as a training base for American fighter squadrons across Europe. It also hosts the main Spanish Army academy, Academia General Militar, a number of brigades at San Gregorio, and other garrisons.

Culture
Christianity took root in Zaragoza at an early date. According to legend, St. Mary appeared miraculously to Saint James the Great in Zaragoza in the first century, standing on a pillar. This apparition is commemorated by a famous Catholic basilica called Nuestra Señora del Pilar ('Our Lady of the Pillar').

The Aragonese language, in decline for centuries and restricted mostly to northern Aragon, has recently attracted more people in the region. Thus, nowadays, in Zaragoza, up to 7,000 people speak Aragonese.

Festivals 

The annual Fiestas del Pilar last for nine days, with its main day on 12 October.

Holy Week in Zaragoza, although not as elaborate an affair as its Andalusian or Bajo Aragón counterparts, has several processions passing through the city centre every day with dramatic sculptures, black-dressed praying women and hundreds of hooded people playing drums. It has been a Festival of International Tourist Interest since 2014.

Education
The University of Zaragoza is based in the city. As one of the oldest universities in Spain and a major research and development centre, this public university awards all the highest academic degrees in dozens of fields. Zaragoza is also home to the MIT-Zaragoza International Logistics Program, a unique partnership between MIT, the Government of Aragon and the University of Zaragoza.

There is a French international primary and secondary school, Lycée Français Molière de Saragosse.

Transport

Roads 

The city is connected by motorway with the main cities in central and northern Spain, including Madrid, Barcelona, Valencia, and Bilbao, all of which are located about 300 kilometres (200 miles) from Zaragoza.

Buses 
The city has a network of buses which is controlled by the Urban Buses of Zaragoza (AUZSA). The network consists of 31 regular lines (two of them circle lines), two scheduled routes, six shuttle buses (one free), and seven night buses operating on Fridays, Saturdays and other festivities. Zaragoza also has an interurban bus network operated by Transport Consortium Zaragoza Area (CTAZ) that operates 17 regular lines.

Bicycle 
Zaragoza's bicycle lanes facilitate non-motorised travel and help cyclists to avoid running into pedestrians and motor vehicles.

Tram 
The first line of the Zaragoza tram (Valdespartera-Parque Goya) is fully operational.

Railway 
Zaragoza is a part of the Spanish high-speed railway operated by Renfe, AVE, which connects Madrid, Lleida, Tarragona, Barcelona and Figueres via high-speed rail. Madrid can be reached in 75 minutes, and Barcelona in approximately 90 minutes. The central station is Zaragoza–Delicias railway station, which serves both railway lines and coaches. In addition to long-distance railway lines and the high-speed trains, Zaragoza has a network of commuter trains operated by Renfe called Cercanías Zaragoza.

Airport 

Zaragoza Airport is located in the Garrapinillos neighbourhood, 10 kilometres from the city centre.

It is a major commercial airport, its freight traffic surpassing that of Barcelona El Prat in 2012, and serves as the home of the Spanish Air Force's 15th Group. It was also used by NASA as a contingency landing site for the Space Shuttle in the case of a Transoceanic Abort Landing (TAL).

Public transportation statistics
The average amount of time people spend commuting with public transit in Zaragoza, for example to and from work, on a weekday is 48 minutes. 9% of public transit riders ride for more than two hours every day. The average amount of time people wait at a stop or station for public transit is 11 minutes, while 12% of riders wait for over 20 minutes on average every day.

Sports

Football
 
Zaragoza's main football team, Real Zaragoza, plays in the Segunda División. Founded on 18 March 1932, its home games are played at La Romareda, which seats 34,596 spectators. The club has spent the majority of its history in La Liga. One of the most remarkable events in the team's recent history is the winning of the former UEFA Cup Winners' Cup in 1995. The team has also won the Spanish National Cup, Copa del Rey, six times: 1965, 1966, 1986, 1994, 2001 and 2004 and an Inter-Cities Fairs Cup (1964). A government survey in 2007 found that 2.7% of the Spanish population support the club, making them the seventh-most supported in the country.

Zaragoza's second football team is CD Ebro. Founded in 1942, it plays in Segunda División B – Group 2, holding home games at Campo Municipal de Fútbol La Almozara, which has a capacity of 1,000 seats.

Zaragoza CFF is a Spanish women's football team from Zaragoza playing in Primera División Femenina.

Zaragoza was one of the Spanish cities which hosted the FIFA World Cup 1982. Three matches were played at La Romareda.

Basketball

The main basketball team, Basket Zaragoza, known as Tecnyconta Zaragoza for sponsorship reasons, plays in the Liga ACB. They play their home games at the Pabellón Principe Felipe with a capacity of 10,744.

Stadium Casablanca, a.k.a. Mann Filter for sponsorship reasons, is the Spanish women's basketball club from Zaragoza that plays in the Primera Division.

Futsal
The main futsal team, is Dlink Zaragoza, plays in the LNFS Primera División. They play at the Pabellón Siglo XXI with a capacity of 2,600.

Other sports

Zaragoza's handball team, BM Aragón, plays in the Liga ASOBAL.

The Spanish Baja or Baja Aragon is a Rally raid event held in the region of Aragon in northern Spain. This event was launched in 1983, and chose the desert of Monegros because of the scenery and availability of service infrastructure in Zaragoza.

Zaragoza was strongly associated with Jaca in its failed bid for the 2014 Winter Olympics.

There are three Rugby Union teams playing in the regional league:
 Ibero Club de Rugby Zaragoza
 Fénix Club de Rugby
 Club Deportivo Universitario de Rugby

A permanent feature built for Expo 2008 is the pump-powered artificial whitewater course .

Main sights

Near the basilica on the banks of the Ebro are located the city hall, the Lonja (old currency exchange), La Seo (literally 'the See' in the Aragonese language) or Cathedral of San Salvador, a church built over the main mosque (partially preserved in the 11th-century north wall of the Parroquieta), with Romanesque apses from the 12th century; inside, the imposing hall church from the 15th to 16th centuries, the Baroque tower, and finally, with its famous Museum of Tapestries near the Roman ruins of forum and port city wall.

Also in the city centre, there is the palace of the Aljafería, conceived in the third quarter of the 11th century on behalf of the Hudid dynasty, featuring in its interior one of the most rich and complex instances of ornamental Islamic art, either Western or Eastern. It currently serves as the site of the Aragonese parliament.

The churches of San Pablo, Santa María Magdalena and San Gil Abad were built in the 14th century, but the towers may be old minarets dating from the 11th century; San Miguel (14th century); Santiago (San Ildefonso) and the Fecetas monastery are Baroque with Mudéjar ceilings of the 17th century. All the churches are Mudéjar monuments that comprise a World Heritage Site.

Other important sights are the stately houses and palaces in the city, mainly of the 16th century: palaces of the count of Morata or Luna (Audiencia), Deán, Torrero, Don Lope or Real Maestranza, count of Sástago, count of Argillo (today the Pablo Gargallo museum), archbishop, etc.  On 14 June 2008, the site of Expo 2008 opened its doors to the public. The exhibition ran until 14 September.

Other sights

 Puente de Piedra
 San Ildefonso church
 Santa Engracia Monastery
 Fuente de la Hispanidad

Museums in Zaragoza are:
 Museum of Fine Arts Zaragoza, with paintings by early Aragonese artists, 15th century, and by El Greco, Ribera and Goya.
 Museo Goya - Colección Ibercaja - Museo Camón Aznar with works by Rubens, Rembrandt, Van Dyck, Velazquez and Goya to Renoir, Manet and Sorolla.

Twin towns and sister cities

Zaragoza is twinned with:

Zaragoza has special bilateral collaboration agreements with:

Notable people
 Al-Saraqusti (died 1143), twelfth century Andalusi lexicographer, poet, philologist
 Avempace (1085–1138), polymath
 Bahya ben Joseph ibn Paquda (1050–1120), the author of Chovot HaLevavot
 Sebastián Pozas (1876–1946), military officer
 Abraham Abulafia (1240–1291), founder of the school of "Prophetic Kabbalah"
 Amaral (band) (established 1992), popular musical band in Spain and America.
 Alonso Fernández de Heredia (died March 19, 1782), Captain General and governor of Honduras (1747), Florida (1751–1758), Yucatán (in modern-day Mexico; 1758–?), the Captaincy General of Guatemala (1761–1771) and Nicaragua (1761–1771).
 Ramón Ferreñac (1763–1832), composer
 José Luis Gil (born 1957), actor
 Luis de Horruytiner (? – ?), governor of Spanish Florida (1633 – 1638), and viceroy of Sardinia
 Rafael Navarro (born 8 October 1940), photographer
 Dino Valls (born 1959), painter.
 José María Vigil (born 1946), theologian
 Irene Vallejo, writer

See also
 Crown of Aragon
 Roman Catholic Archdiocese of Zaragoza
 Third Millennium Bridge

References 
Informational notes

Citations

Bibliography

External links

 Council of Zaragoza
 Zaragoza Tourism Board Official Website 
 Demographics in 2015: Zaragoza City council

 
Aragon
Roman towns and cities in Spain